Bathytoma stenos is a species of sea snail, a marine gastropod mollusk in the family Borsoniidae.

Distribution
This marine species occurs off the Philippines (Bohol Sea).

Description
The height of this species varies between 35 mm and 50 mm.

References

 Puillandre N., Sysoev A.V., Olivera B.M., Couloux A. & Bouchet P. (2010) Loss of planktotrophy and speciation: geographical fragmentation in the deep-water gastropod genus Bathytoma (Gastropoda, Conoidea) in the western Pacific. Systematics and Biodiversity 8(3): 371-394

External links
 

stenos
Gastropods described in 2010